Artturi Antero Niemelä (23 August 1923 – 11 April 2021) was a Finnish homesteader and politician. He was a member of the Parliament of Finland, representing the Finnish Rural Party (SMP) from 1970 to 1972 and the Finnish People's Unity Party (SKYP) from 1972 to 1975. He was born in Kemijärvi. He died in April 2021 at the age of 97.

References

1923 births
2021 deaths
Finnish military personnel of World War II
Finnish People's Unity Party politicians
Finnish Rural Party politicians
Members of the Parliament of Finland (1970–72)
Members of the Parliament of Finland (1972–75)
People from Kemijärvi